The men's triple jump event at the 1967 Summer Universiade was held at the National Olympic Stadium in Tokyo on 4 September 1967.

Results

References

Athletics at the 1967 Summer Universiade
1967